The Big Snow is a book by Berta and Elmer Hader.  Released by Macmillan Publishers, it was the recipient of the Caldecott Medal for illustration in 1949.

Synopsis
The Big Snow tells the story of how the woodland animals prepare themselves for the upcoming winter. The animals, after noticing the falling leaves and how quickly the days begin to darken they know that it is wintertime. The geese fly south looking for sunshine and a clear sky while the rest start to get ready for the cold weather.

Awards

ALA Notable Children's Books
ALA Caldecott Medal (1949)

References

American picture books
Caldecott Medal–winning works
1948 children's books